Bilal Rifaat (born 27 September 1957) is an Egyptian fencer. He competed in the individual and team foil events at the 1984 Summer Olympics.

References

External links
 

1957 births
Living people
Egyptian male foil fencers
Olympic fencers of Egypt
Fencers at the 1984 Summer Olympics